Colin Morven Sharman, Baron Sharman OBE (born 19 February 1943), is the former British chairman of Aviva Group and former chairman of KPMG International.

He was educated at Bishop Wordsworth's School in Salisbury and qualified as a chartered accountant in 1965. He joined Peat Marwick Mitchell the following year, and rose through the years to become chairman of the renamed KPMG in 1997.

Sharman was appointed an Officer of the Order of the British Empire (OBE) in the 1980 Birthday Honours, for services to the British community in the Netherlands.

He married his partner Angela Timmons and had two children, Sarah and Richard. Sarah had three children with her husband Peter Berridge named, Emily, Charlie and Oscar. Richard had two children with his wife Holly Curtis named, William and Florence 

On 2 August 1999 he was created a Life Peer as Baron Sharman, of Redlynch in the County of Wiltshire and entered the House of Lords as a Liberal Democrat peer. He retired from the House of Lords on 30 April 2015.

Lord Sharman was a member of the ABN AMRO Supervisory Board from 2003 until 2007. He was chairman of Aviva Group from January 2006 to June 2012, was a non-executive director at Reed Elsevier until April 2011, and on the board of BG Group and Group 4 Securicor. Other previous board appointments include chairman of Aegis Group plc; deputy chairman of G4S plc; Young & Co's Brewery plc and AEA Technology plc. He attended the 2014 Moroccan British Business Conference, held in London, alongside Lord Mayor of London Fiona Woolf.

Arms

References

External links
Lord Sharman profile on the Liberal Democrats website
Lord Sharman in The Times Power 100 list
Announcement of his introduction at the House of Lords House of Lords minutes of proceedings, 27 October 1999

1943 births
Living people
British accountants
Liberal Democrats (UK) life peers
Officers of the Order of the British Empire
People educated at Bishop Wordsworth's School
Aviva people
KPMG people
Life peers created by Elizabeth II